The 2021 Canadian Curling Trials Direct-Entry Event was held from September 22 to 26 at the RA Centre in Ottawa, Ontario. The event was held to qualify two men's teams and three women's teams for the 2021 Canadian Olympic Curling Trials.

On the men's side, Teams Mike McEwen and Matt Dunstone secured the two Trials berths, both finishing 5–1 through the round robin and qualifying rounds. McEwen's only loss came to Dunstone in Draw 2 with Dunstone dropping their first game to Glenn Howard before running the table. The three teams who did not qualify, Colton Flasch, Jason Gunnlaugson, and Glenn Howard, will still have a chance to reach the Olympic Trials, as they drop into the 2021 Canadian Olympic Curling Pre-Trials.

On the women's side, Teams Casey Scheidegger, Kelsey Rocque, and Laura Walker all secured berths to the trials, beating out Corryn Brown and Suzanne Birt for the three spots. After the round robin concluded, Teams Scheidegger and Rocque both had 3–1 records, qualifying them directly to the trials. Team Walker posted a 2–2 record while Teams Brown and Birt shared 1–3 records. Due to Brown beating Birt in the round robin, they earned the spot in the playoff against Team Walker for the third spot. In the playoff, Brown needed to beat Walker twice to earn the trials spot, whereas Walker only needed one win to clinch the spot. Brown defeated Walker in the first game, however, Walker then won the second game to earn the third and final spot at the trials in Saskatoon. Teams Corryn Brown and Suzanne Birt will now play in the Pre-Trials for a second opportunity to earn their spot in the Olympic Trials.

Qualification process
Five men's teams and five women's teams qualified for the event based on qualifications standards over the previous seasons. Teams who had not automatically qualified for the trials qualified for this event if they met one of the following three criteria:
• Canadian teams in the top 18 of the World Curling Team Ranking as of August 31, 2020,
• Eligible teams that finished in the top 9 of the Canadian Team Ranking System in 2019–20,
• Eligible teams that finished in the top 7 of the Canadian Team Ranking System in 2018–19.

The teams that didn't qualify for the trials via this event had a second chance to make the trials through the 2021 Canadian Olympic Curling Pre-Trials scheduled for October 26 to 31 at the Queens Place Emera Centre in Liverpool, Nova Scotia.

For the men's tournament, there were 2 spots available in the 2021 Canadian Olympic Curling Trials for direct-entry. For the women's tournament, there were 3 spots available.

Men

Teams
The teams are listed as follows:

Round Robin

Round-robin standings
Final round-robin standings

Round-robin results
All draw times are listed in Eastern Time (UTC−04:00).

Draw 1
Wednesday, September 22, 8:00 pm

Draw 2
Thursday, September 23, 12:00 pm

Draw 3
Thursday, September 23, 8:00 pm

Draw 4
Friday, September 24, 12:00 pm

Draw 5
Friday, September 24, 8:00 pm

Qualifying round

Qualifying round standings
Final qualifying round standings
Note: one game (Flasch vs. Howard) was not played as Dunstone and McEwen had already qualified.

Qualifying round results
All draw times are listed in Eastern Time (UTC−04:00).

Draw 6
Saturday, September 25, 1:00 pm

Draw 7
Saturday, September 25, 9:00 pm

Draw 8
Sunday, September 26, 10:00 am

(Not played; unnecessary)

Women

Teams
The teams are listed as follows:

Round-robin standings
Final round-robin standings

Round-robin results 
All draw times are listed in Eastern Time (UTC−04:00).

Draw 1
Thursday, September 23, 4:00 pm

Draw 2
Friday, September 24, 12:00 pm

Draw 3
Friday, September 24, 8:00 pm

Draw 4
Saturday, September 25, 1:00 pm

Draw 5
Saturday, September 25, 9:00 pm

Playoff

Team Walker had to be beaten twice.

Game 1
Sunday, September 26, 3:00 pm

Game 2
Sunday, September 26, 8:00 pm

Notes

References

External links
 Info about Trials Qualification

2021 in Canadian curling
2021 in Ontario
Curling in Ottawa
September 2021 sports events in Canada
2020s in Ottawa